Sreekaaram is a 2021 Indian Telugu-language drama film directed by Kishor B and produced by 14 Reels Plus studio. Kishore wrote the script with dialogues by Sai Madhav Burra. The film stars Sharwanand and Priyanka Arul Mohan with Sai Kumar in a pivotal role. 

The film's production commenced in August 2019. It has music scored by Mickey J. Meyer with cinematography and editing by J. Yuvaraju and Marthand K. Venkatesh respectively. Initially scheduled to release on 24 April 2020, it was postponed due to the COVID-19 pandemic. The film is theatrically released on 11 March 2021 and opened to be positive reviews.

Plot
Karthik is a happy-go youngster who is a software engineer. Since his father has many debts, he works in a software company and sends his father the money. Chaitra is in love with Karthik since their college days tries hard to woo him. But Karthik seems uninterested. She even comes with her mother to talk to Karthik for a love recommendation. Meanwhile, Karthik gets a promotion to become the manager in the US branch of his company and everyone was happy but as all his debts are over, Karthik decides to quit his job and become a farmer. When Chaitra asks Karthik to meet her father, he politely rejects saying though he likes her, he plans on being a farmer. This upsets Chaitra's dad and he forbids her to see Karthik. Karthik's father is not happy with his decision and avoids talking to him. Karthik later realizes that everyone in his village who works in the city were leading a very hard life. He calls all his villagers for a meeting and says to come back to the village again to start farming. At first, everyone disagrees with the idea and leaves but later a few villagers decide to do farming again. When they approach Karthik, he has an idea of Ummadi Vyavasayam (Collective farming in Telugu). They all like the idea and start getting all the supplies. 

Later, Chaitra comes back for Karthik and she also does farming as well. Ekambaram, zamindar of the village wants to steal all their lands and name their village, Ekambarapuram but Karthik spoils all of his plans. After they sell their first crop, Karthik wanted to use that money to help a fellow villager. Some of them didn't like the idea but reluctantly agree. Later, Ekambaram rumors to villagers that Karthik is using their lands for his own profit. Some of them believe him (Ekambaram) and build fences around their farm. Karthik's father who isn't at good terms with him, asks to sign on the land papers so that he could sell it for his daughter's marriage. Karthik disagrees and his father leaves the village and moves to the city away from Karthik. Meanwhile, a novel Corona virus causes a pandemic and all the roads are blocked,thus crops weren't sent to market. Then, Karthik gets an idea of an app called 'Sreekaram' where they sell crops to the buyers directly instead of supermarkets. The buyers could place the orders and they get  sanitized goods delivered to their home. 

Later, Karthik discovers Ekambaram's plan and confronts him. After a talk, Ekambaram realizes his mistake and starts helping the villagers. Soon, all their crops are sold and the app becomes a big hit. Other villagers who left him earlier, return to the village and join them. Karthik's parents return home too. In the end, Karthik and Chaitra reunite as their parents meet at their sister's marriage.

Cast 

 Sharwanand as Karthik
 Priyanka Arul Mohan as Chaitra
 Rao Ramesh as Kesavulu, Karthik's father
 Naresh as Ramana, Karthik's uncle
 Sai Kumar as Ekambaram
 Murali Sharma as Chaitra's father
 Aamani as Karthik's mother
 Gouri Priya Reddy as Bujji, Karthik's sister
 Satya as Karthik's friend
 Shishir Sharma as Karthik's manager
 Giri Babu as Anantha Raju, Ekambaram's father-in-law
 Sapthagiri as Karthik's colleague
 Prabhas Sreenu as Ekambaram's brother-in-law
 Mamilla Shailaja Priya as Ekambaram's wife
 Madhumani as Ramana's wife
 Dhethadi Harika as Chaitra's friend
 Ravi Teja Mahadasyam as Ravi, Karthik's colleague
 Swapnika as Karthik's colleague
 Rajsekhar Aningi as a farmer
 Devi Prasad
 Mohit Pedada as a CS student

Production 
In October 2018, it was reported that Nani was approached for a project by 14 Reels Entertainment's Ram and Gopi Achanta. Directed by debutant filmmaker Kishore Reddy, the lead would play the role of a farmer. However, Sharwanand was confirmed for the role. Titled Sreekaram, the film was launched formally with a puja ceremony on 30 June 2019 at the office of 14 Reels Plus with Sukumar clapping the first shot. The film was based of Kiran Abbavaram's short film of the same name.

With Priyanka Arul Mohan was cast in a lead role in July 2019. Principal photography of the film was commenced in August 2019 in Hyderabad. Village portions were scheduled to be filmed near Anantapur and Tirupati in November 2019.

The final leg of the film's shoot was scheduled in March 2020 at Hyderabad. However, the shoot was postponed due to the COVID-19 pandemic lockdown in India. The filming was resumed in October 2020 and completed a 20-day long schedule at Tirupati.

Soundtrack 

The music for the film is composed by Mickey J. Meyer. On 5 November 2020, the makers released the promo of the first single titled as "Bhalegundi Baalaa", which had lyrics written by Penchal Das, also providing the male vocals of the song, while female vocals were rendered by Nutana Mohan. The full song was released by Lahari Music on 9 November 2020. On 7 January 2021, the makers unveiled the promo of the song "Sandalle Sandalle" which had lyrics written by Sanapati Bharadwaj Patrudu, and vocals by Anurag Kulkarni and Mohana Bhogaraju, and the full song was released the same day.

Release 
The film was originally scheduled to release on the Sankranthi occasion, although in order to avoid clash with Ala Vaikunthapurramuloo & Sarileru Neekevvaru, the makers postponed its release to summer. On 1 February 2020, the makers announced the release date as 24 April 2020. However, the release was postponed due to the COVID-19 pandemic. In September 2020, the filmmakers entered discussions to release the film via over-the-top media services. The film was theatrically released on 11 March 2021. The film was dubbed and released in Tamil under the same title, Sreekaram.

Reception
Y. Sunitha Chowdhary of The Hindu called it a "Routine film on farming." She felt that well-intended film could have benefited from a better plot and screenplay. The Times of India critic Thadhagadh Pathi rated the film 3/5 and wrote: "Sreekaram is an honest attempt to shine light on the plight of the farmers in our country and to show the future generation how it can be a viable profession," however the reviewer added that film should have been more realistic in its approach.

References

External links 
 

Films shot in Hyderabad, India
Films postponed due to the COVID-19 pandemic
Films shot in Andhra Pradesh
2020s Telugu-language films
Films set in Andhra Pradesh
2021 drama films
Films about the COVID-19 pandemic
2021 films
Indian drama films
Films about food and drink